Paraceroglyphus is a genus of mites in the family Acaridae.

Species
 Paraceroglyphus californicus Fain & Schwan, 1984
 Paraceroglyphus cynomydis O'Connor & Pfaffenberger, 1987
 Paraceroglyphus metes Fain & Beaucournu, 1973

References

Acaridae